Yox may refer to:

 Yox, nickname of American baseball player Ken Harrelson
 River Yox, Suffolk, England